Uma Kunka (Quechua uma mountain top; head, kunka throat, Hispanicized spelling Umacunca) is a mountain in the Huancavelica Region in Peru, about  high. It is located in the Huaytará Province, in the north of the Pilpichaca District. It lies south of a little lake named Yanaqucha ("black lake").

References 

Mountains of Peru
Mountains of Huancavelica Region